The men's 4 × 100 metres relay event was part of the track and field athletics programme at the 1920 Summer Olympics. It was the second appearance of this event. The competition was held on Saturday, August 21, 1920, and on Sunday, August 22, 1920. Fifty-two runners from 13 nations competed.

Records

These were the standing world and Olympic records (in seconds) prior to the 1920 Summer Olympics.

In the final the team of the United States set a new world record with 42.2 seconds.

Results

Semifinals

The semi-finals were held on Saturday, August 21, 1920.

Semifinal 1

Semifinal 2

Semifinal 3

Final

The final was held on Sunday, August 22, 1920.

References

External links
 
 

Relay 4x100 metre
Relay foot races at the Olympics